Carcosa is a fictional city in Ambrose Bierce's short story "An Inhabitant of Carcosa" (1886). The ancient and mysterious city is barely described and is viewed only in hindsight (after its destruction) by a character who once lived there.

American writer Robert W. Chambers borrowed the name "Carcosa" for his stories, inspiring generations of authors to similarly use Carcosa in their own works.

The King in Yellow
The city was later used more extensively in Robert W. Chambers' book of short horror stories published in 1895, titled The King in Yellow. Chambers had read Bierce's work and borrowed a few additional names from his work, including Hali and Hastur.

In Chambers' stories, and within the apocryphal play titled The King in Yellow, which is mentioned several times within them, the city of Carcosa is a mysterious, ancient, and possibly cursed place. The most precise description of its location is the shores of Lake Hali, either on another planet, or in another universe.

For instance:

—"Cassilda's Song" in The King in Yellow Act 1, Scene 2

Associated names
Lake Hali is a misty lake found near the city of Hastur. In the fictional play The King in Yellow (obliquely described by author Robert W. Chambers in the collection of short stories of the same title), the mysterious cities of Alar and Carcosa stand beside the lake. Like Carcosa, it is referenced in the Cthulhu Mythos stories of H.P. Lovecraft and the authors who followed him.

The name Hali originated in Ambrose Bierce's "An Inhabitant of Carcosa" (1886) in which Hali is the author of a quote which prefaces the story. The narrator of the story implies that the person named Hali is now dead (at least in the timeline of the story).

Several other nearly undescribed places are alluded to in Chambers' writing, among them Hastur, Yhtill, and Aldebaran. "Aldebaran" may refer to the star Aldebaran, likely as it is also associated with the mention of the Hyades star cluster, with which it shares space in the night sky. The Yellow Sign, described as a symbol, not of any human script, is supposed to originate from the same place as Carcosa.

One other name associated is "Demhe" and its "cloudy depths" − this has never been explained either by Chambers or any famous pastiche-writer and so we do not know what or who exactly "Demhe" is.

Marion Zimmer Bradley (and Diana L. Paxson since Bradley's death) also used these names in her Darkover series.

Bierce may have  been inspired by the then contemporary genocide of the similarly named Circassia peoples.

Other appearances

Written references
Later writers, including H. P. Lovecraft and his many admirers, became great fans of Chambers' work and incorporated the name of Carcosa into their own stories, set in the Cthulhu Mythos. The King in Yellow and Carcosa have inspired many modern authors, including Karl Edward Wagner ("The River of Night's Dreaming"), Joseph S. Pulver ("Carl Lee & Cassilda"), Lin Carter, James Blish, Michael Cisco ("He Will Be There"), Ann K. Schwader, Robert M. Price, Galad Elflandsson, Simon Strantzas ("Beyond the Banks of the River Seine"), Charles Stross (in the Laundry Files series), Anders Fager and S. M. Stirling (in the Emberverse series).

Joseph S. Pulver has written nearly 30 tales and poems that are based on and/or include Carcosa, The King in Yellow, or other elements from Robert W. Chambers. Pulver also edited an anthology A Season in Carcosa of new tales based upon The King in Yellow, released by Miskatonic River Press in 2012.

John Scott Tynes contributed to the mythology of Chambers' Carcosa in a series of novellas, "Broadalbin", "Ambrose", and "Sosostris", and essays in issue #1 of The Unspeakable Oath and in Delta Green.

In Paul Edwin Zimmer's Dark Border series, Carcosa is a city where humans mingle with their nearly immortal allies, the Hastur.

In Robert Shea and Robert Anton Wilson's The Illuminatus! Trilogy, Carcosa is connected with an ancient civilization in the Gobi Desert, destroyed when the Illuminati arrived on Earth via flying saucers from the planet Vulcan.

In maps of the world of George R. R. Martin's A Song of Ice and Fire, a city named Carcosa is labeled on the easternmost edge of the map along the coast of a large lake, near other magical cities such as Asshai. In The World of Ice and Fire, it is mentioned that a sorcerer lord lives there who claims to be the sixty-ninth Yellow Emperor, from a dynasty fallen for a thousand years.

In the short story "Dinner in Carcosa", Western Canadian author Allan Williams re-imagines Carcosa as an abandoned Alberta prairie town with still-active insurance policies held by an ominous firm called "Hastur & Associates". The story revolves around a chance encounter between a young insurance adjuster and the Ambrosovich family.

In the satirical novel Kamus of Kadizhar: The Black Hole of Carcosa by John Shirley (St. Martin's Press, 1988), Carcosa is the name of a planet whose weird black hole physics figures in the story.

Swedish writer Anders Fager's "Miss Witt's Great Work of Art" features a Stockholm-based coterie known as "The Carcosa Foundation" that worships Hastur.

In David Drake's Lord of the Isles series, Carcosa is the name of the ancient capital of the old kingdom, which collapsed a thousand years before the events of the series.

In S.M. Stirling's Emberverse series, Carcosa is the name of a South Pacific city inhabited by evil people led by the Yellow Raja and the Pallid Mask.

In Lawrence Watt-Evans' The Lords of Dûs series, a character known as the Forgotten King, who dresses in yellow rags, reveals that he was exiled from Carcosa.

In writer Alan Moore's Neonomicon, drawn by artist Jacen Burrowes, the character Johnny Carcosa is the key to a mystical Lovecraftian universe.

Television
In the HBO original series True Detective, 'Carcosa' is presented as a man-made temple. Located in the backwoods of Louisiana, the temple serves as a place of ritualistic sexual abuse of children and child murder organized by a group of wealthy Louisiana politicians and church leaders. The main characters, Rust Cohle and Marty Hart, storm the temple in the final episode of the season, where they confront a serial killer, who is the most active member of the cult. It is understood that the cult worships the "Yellow King", to whom an effigy is dedicated in the main chamber of 'Carcosa'. The series hints at a larger conspiracy that continues beyond the show, which is in line with Lovecraftian horror, as is a vision experienced by one character that underscores Lovecraftian themes like cosmic indifference.

In Part 3 of the Chilling Adventures of Sabrina, the barker of the traveling amusement park and carnival is named Carcosa, and the carnival in turn named, presumably, after him. Throughout the season of the show, it becomes apparent that the workers at the carnival are all mythological beings of old, with Carcosa himself being the god Pan, his true form being that of a satyr, in the show understood to be the god of madness. The arc of the season revolves partially around the attempts of the carnival workers to resurrect an older deity identified as The Green Man. Themes of madness, death, and resurrection parallel the works of Robert W. Chambers et al.

Other references 
In the 1991 EP Passage to Arcturo by Rotting Christ, the song "Inside The Eye of Algond" nominates the Mystical Carcosa as part of the singer's journey.

The second song of the 2015 album Luminiferous by the American metal band High on Fire is named Carcosa.

Swedish rapper Yung Lean's third album Stranger features the closing track "Yellowman". Carcosa is mentioned in the song.

In 2016, DigiTech released a fuzz pedal called the Carcosa. The pedal featured two modes, named "Hali" and "Demhe".

Maria, a film by King Abalos, takes place in a mysterious mountain called Carcosa.

In the Mass Effect 3 video game, there is a planet named Carcosa.

In 2001, the Belgian black metal band Ancient Rites released the album Dim Carcosa. The title track's lyrics consist of excerpts from "Cassilda's Song".

In the early 2000s, a Mysterious Package Company experience called The King in Yellow was introduced, heavily inspired by story and title. Later, a sequel experience entitled Carcosa: Rise of the Cult was created, obviously connected to this shared universe and connected to the original The King in Yellow.

In 2017, Fantasy Flight Games released an expansion for Arkham Horror: The Card Game titled "The Path to Carcosa" in which players investigate occurrences based on The King in Yellow.

The 2019 EP On the Shores of Hali by Cassilda and Carcosa makes numerous references to Chamber's version of Carcosa.

In the indie game World of Horror there is an item called the Karukosa Mask.

"The King In Yellow" an experimental film by Cole Frederick portrays the creation of Carcosa.

Carcosa is mentioned in the song "Strange and Eternal" of the 2022 album Netherheaven by the American technical death metal band Revocation.

Music 
Carcosa is a deathcore band from Vancouver that boasts musician Andrew Baena, who's been running a popular metal-oriented YouTube channel for nearly a decade, and vocalist Johnny Ciardullo, who plays guitar in the other, more popular Vancouver deathcore band AngelMaker.

Publishers using the name Carcosa
Two different publishers have used the name Carcosa.

Carcosa House
Carcosa House was a science fiction specialty publishing firm formed in 1947 by Frederick B. Shroyer, a boyhood friend of T. E. Dikty, and two Los Angeles science fiction fans, Russell Hodgkins and Paul Skeeters.  Shroyer had secured a copy of the original newspaper appearance of the novel Edison's Conquest of Mars by Garrett P. Serviss which he wished to publish.  Shroyer talked Hodgkins and Skeeters into going in on shares to form the publisher which issued the Serviss book in 1947.  Dikty offered advice, and William L. Crawford of F.P.C.I. helped with production and distribution.  Carcosa House announced one other book, Enter Ghost: A Study in Weird Fiction, by Sam Russell, but due to slow sales of the Serviss book, it was never published.

Works published by Carcosa House
 Edison's Conquest of Mars, by Garrett P. Serviss (1947)

Carcosa

Carcosa was a specialty publishing firm formed by David Drake, Karl Edward Wagner, and Jim Groce, who were concerned that Arkham House would cease publication after the death of its founder, August Derleth. Carcosa was founded in North Carolina in 1973 and put out four collections of pulp horror stories, all edited by Wagner. Their first book was a huge omnibus volume of the best non-series weird fiction by Manly Wade Wellman. It was enhanced by a group of chilling illustrations by noted fantasy artists Lee Brown Coye. Their other three volumes were also giant omnibus collections (of work by Hugh B. Cave, E. Hoffman Price, and again by Manly Wade Wellman). A fifth collection was planned, Death Stalks the Night, by Hugh B. Cave; Lee Brown Coye was working on illustrating it when he suffered a crippling stroke in 1977 and eventually died, causing Carcosa to abandon the project. The book was eventually published by Fedogan & Bremer. Carcosa also had plans to issue volumes by Leigh Brackett, H. Warner Munn, and Jack Williamson; however, none of the projected volumes appeared. The Carcosa colophon depicts the silhouette of a towered city in front of three moons.

Awards
 1976, World Fantasy Award, Special Award - Non-Professional to Karl Edward Wagner, David Drake & Jim Groce for Carcosa.

Works published by Carcosa
 Worse Things Waiting, by Manly Wade Wellman (1973)
 Far Lands, Other Days, by E. Hoffmann Price (1975)
 Murgunstrumm and Others, by Hugh B. Cave (1977)
 Lonely Vigils, by Manly Wade Wellman (1981)

Places called Carcosa
In 1896–7, the Carcosa mansion was built as the official residence of the Resident-General of the Federated Malay States for the first holder of that office, Sir Frank Swettenham. It was in use as a luxury hotel, the Carcosa Seri Negara, from 1989 to 2015 and has been abandoned since then. Swettenham took the name from The King in Yellow.

In the Quebec-based geopolitical/live-action role-play game Bicolline, Carcosa is a kingdom in the west. It was established upon principles of freedom and is populated by pirates, gypsies, escaped slaves, and religious exiles.

Notes

References

Further reading
 Rehearsals for Oblivion: Act 1—Tales of The King in Yellow, edited by Peter A. Worthy, Elder Signs Press 2007
 Strange Aeons 3 (an issue dedicated to The King in Yellow), edited by Rick Tillman and K.L. Young, Autumn 2010
 The Hastur Cycle, edited by Robert M. Price, Chaosium 1993
 The Yellow Sign and Other Stories, edited by S.T. Joshi, Chaosium 2004

External links
 
 

Cthulhu Mythos locations
Fictional populated places
Book publishing companies based in North Carolina
Fantasy book publishers
Horror book publishing companies
Small press publishing companies
Publishing companies established in 1947
Publishing companies established in 1973
1973 establishments in North Carolina